Jason Johnson may refer to:

Sportsmen
Jason Johnson (baseball) (born 1973), American baseball player
Jason Johnson (Jamaican footballer) (born 1990), Jamaican soccer player for  Phoenix Rising FC
Jason Johnson (Australian footballer) (born 1978), retired Australian rules footballer
Jason Johnson (quarterback) (born 1979), former Canadian Football League player
Jason Johnson (offensive lineman) (born 1974), American football player
Jason Johnson (wide receiver) (born 1965), American football player

Others
Jason Johnson (actor) (born 1974), American kickboxer and actor
Jason Johnson (professor), Morgan State University professor and political editor of The Source magazine
Jason Johnson (radio presenter) (born 1967), Canadian radio presenter who works in the radio industry in Singapore
Jason Johnson (University of the Cumberlands), a student expelled from the University of the Cumberlands because he is gay
Jason Johnson (entrepreneur), American technology entrepreneur and investor

See also
Jason Johnston, musician
Jay Johnson (disambiguation)